The 2014–15 season of the Bayernliga, the second highest association football league in Bavaria, was the seventh season of the league at tier five (V) of the German football league system and the 70th season overall since establishment of the league in 1945. The regular season started on 11 July 2014 and finished on 23 May 2015, followed by relegation play-off games. The league season was interrupted by a winter break, which lasted from late November 2014 to 28 February 2015.

Modus
The northern division of the Bayernliga consists of 18 clubs while the southern division consists of 19. Clubs in each division will play each other in a home-and-away format with no league games played between clubs from different divisions during the regular season. The champions of each division were directly promoted to the Regionalliga, subject to fulfilling the licensing regulations of the later with no overall Bayernliga championship game being played between the two league winners. The runners-up of each league takes part in promotion round with the 16th and 15th placed clubs in the Regionalliga. The four clubs play for one more spot in the Regionalliga in 2015–16 unless the Regionalliga champion wins promotion to the 3. Liga, in which case two spots in the league may become available. Should the champions or runners-up not receive approval for a Regionalliga licence the direct promotion and play off spots will be passed down to the highest placed club with a licence approval.

The bottom two teams in the southern division and the bottom team in the northern division are directly relegated while the 15th, 16th and 17th placed teams from both divisions as well as the 14th placed team with the lesser points take part in the relegation playoffs with the five Landesliga runners-up.

Seven Bayernliga clubs applied for a Regionalliga licence for 2015–16, these being FC Pipinsried and TSV Rain am Lech from the southern division and Viktoria Aschaffenburg, FC Amberg, SpVgg SV Weiden, TSV Großbardorf and SpVgg Bayern Hof from the northern division, with all of them having their application approved.

2014–15 Standings

Bayernliga Nord 
The division featured four new clubs with TSV Neudrossenfeld and SpVgg Ansbach having been promoted from the Landesliga while SpVgg Bayern Hof and Viktoria Aschaffenburg had been relegated from the Regionalliga.

Bayernliga Süd 
The division featured six new clubs with TSV Landsberg, TSV 1865 Dachau, 1. FC Bad Kötzting and DJK Vilzing having been promoted from the Landesliga while TSV Rain am Lech  and TSV 1860 Rosenheim had been relegated from the Regionalliga.

Top goalscorers
The top goal scorers for the season:

Nord

Süd

Promotion play-offs
Promotion/relegation play-offs will be held at the end of the season for both the Regionalliga above and the Bayernliga:

To the Regionalliga
The 15th and 16th placed Regionalliga teams, SV Heimstetten and VfR Garching, play the runners-up of the northern and southern division. In the north this is FC Amberg while, in the south, FC Pipinsried qualified regardless of its place in the table as no other team applied for a Regionalliga licence. The winner of these games then play each other for one more spot in the Regionalliga. Should TSV 1860 Munich have suffered relegation from the 2. Bundesliga its reserve team would be forced to leave the Regionalliga. In this case 17th placed Regionalliga club SV Seligenporten would have entered the relegation play-offs and Heimstetten would retain their Regionalliga place.

First round
First leg

Second leg

Second round
The winners of the first round play each other for the one available spot in the Regionalliga:
First leg

Second leg

To the Bayernliga
The second placed teams of each of the five Landesliga division, together with the worst 14th placed team and the 15th, 16th and 17th placed teams from the two Bayernligas enter a play-off for the remaining three places in the 2015–16 Bayernliga. The twelve teams will be split into three groups of four clubs.

Northern group
First round – first leg

First round – second leg

Sand won 4–0 on aggregate.

Selbitz won 3–3 on aggregate (away goal rule).

Second round – first leg

Second round – second leg

Sand won 7–1 on aggregate.

Central group
First round – first leg

First round – second leg

Burglengenfeld won 3–1 on aggregate.

Kötzting won 3–1 on aggregate.

Second round – first leg

Second round – second leg

Burglengenfeld won 4–2 on aggregate.

Southern group
First round – first leg

First round – second leg

Illertissen won 3–2 on aggregate.

Erlbach won 2–0 on aggregate.
Second round – first leg

Second round – second leg

Erlbach won 3–0 on aggregate.

References

External links 
  of the Bavarian Football Association 

2014-15
Bayern